"Loud Like Love" is a song by English alternative rock band Placebo, from their seventh album Loud Like Love. It was released as a digital download single on 6 August 2013, and later on 7" vinyl.

Content 

The single release consists of four tracks – the song, its piano rendition and two remixes.

Music video

Furthering their collaboration with the American transgressive novelist Bret Easton Ellis, fashioned by the music video for "Too Many Friends", Placebo released a similar video for "Loud Like Love", also by Los Angeles director Saman Kesh. Ellis narrates the music video, which revolves around comparable plot lines and can be viewed as either a sequel or a parody of the "Too Many Friends" video.

Track listing

References

External links 

 

2014 singles
Placebo (band) songs
Songs written by Brian Molko
Songs written by Stefan Olsdal
Universal Music Group singles
2013 songs
Songs written by Steve Forrest (musician)